PT Toyota-Astra Motor (also called TAM) is an automobile trading company based in Jakarta, Indonesia. It is a joint venture company between Toyota Motor Corporation and Astra International with a distribution of shares of 50% and 50% respectively, acting as a sole agent, distributor, and importer of Toyota vehicles. It has been the best-selling car brand in Indonesia every year in a row since 1997.

A separate company, PT Toyota Motor Manufacturing Indonesia (also called TMMIN) operated five Toyota manufacturing plants in the country and exported Toyota vehicles overseas. TMMIN is owned 95% by Toyota Motor Corporation and 5% by Astra International.

History 
TAM was established in 1971 as an importer for Toyota vehicles and transformed into a distributor company for the same brand a year later. The earliest models introduced by TAM were Corona and Corolla. Corona, a mid-size family sedan, which periodically changed models in 1974, 1978 and every other four years until in 1999 when it was discontinued to undergo a model change to Camry.

The Corolla was also introduced in Indonesia in the early 1970s, and entered its third generation by 1975. The sedan had captured the Indonesian market at the time. Toyota had created a new trend in sedan design: small, compact, and with rear-wheel drive. Both Corona and Corolla were highly accepted in the market during the early years. Later, other Toyota sedans entered the Indonesian market, such as the Starlet which was discontinued in 1998, the locally produced Soluna which was launched in 2000 and discontinued in 2003, and Cressida introduced in 1977 and discontinued in 1992, along with the Crown.

In the 4x4 class, Toyota introduced Land Cruiser which initially produced in 1950 and entered the Indonesian market in mid-1970s and was colloquially called "Toyota Hardtop". The vehicle was not only used for individual purposes, but also for industrial and military purposes. For commercial purposes, Toyota launched Toyota Dyna and Toyota HiAce; the latter was discontinued, only to return in 2012 as a large van.

In 1977, the Kijang was launched in Jakarta. Developed as a basic utility vehicle specifically for Indonesia and the Philippines, the Kijang was later known for its easy and low-cost maintenance and later became a major success in the Indonesian automotive market. The first generation Kijang sold only 1,168 units during 1977, but a year later it increased to 4,629 units, four times as many as the year before. The number continued to rise during the next several years. The second generation was launched in 1981 with a production volume of 19,323 units in 1985. The third generation was later introduced in 1986 and sold 82,687 units in 1987, the largest sale ever in Kijang's history. Around 500,000 Kijang had been sold in Indonesia up to 1995, while the 1 millionth Kijang rolled out of the assembly line on 23 September 2003.

On 31 December 1998, TAM merged with three other companies: PT Multi Astra (a manufacturing company), PT Toyota Mobilindo (body parts manufacturing company), PT Toyota Engine Indonesia (specializing in engine manufacturing) under the name PT Toyota Astra Motor. Toyota stated the merger was carried out with the goal of improving efficiency, to meet increasing consumers’ demand for quality, and to effectively face competition in automotive industry. TAM initially consisted of two major departments, which are production and marketing departments.

In 2003, the production department was spun off from TAM, creating PT Toyota Motor Manufacturing Indonesia (TMMIN). TMMIN conducted functional activities included casting, engine, stamping and assembling automobiles. Some components were directly supplied from Japan by Toyota Motor Corporation and the remaining was supplied by local components suppliers. Its marketing division is divided into domestic and overseas (export) markets.

In 2003, TAM launched its first collaboration project with Daihatsu, the Avanza. The Avanza was developed as an entry-level small MPV cheaper and smaller than Kijang, manufactured entirely by partner company Astra Daihatsu Motor. A year later, the fifth-generation Kijang was introduced as the Kijang Innova. It was built above the IMV platform, which also spawned the Fortuner SUV and Hilux pick-up.

TAM started selling Lexus vehicles in late 2007 along with the opening of the Lexus Gallery in Jakarta.

Facilities 
In 1998, TAM established a new manufacturing plant together with by parts and engine manufacturing plants in Karawang with the intention of establishing an integrated plant. The role of manufacturing has been passed to TMMIN since 2003 which operated two centers of production (Sunter and Karawang) and one parts center, the largest in Indonesia, which had been computerized since 1982 and was directly on line with Toyota's parts center in Haruhi, Japan. The Karawang plants (first operated in 1998 with total investment Rp 462.2 billion) were considered to be one of the most advanced in Indonesia at the time, built in 100 acres land with a test course and modern installation for environmental safety purposes.

Plants

Models

Current models

Manufactured locally 
 Toyota Avanza (2021–present)
 Toyota Calya (2021–present)
 Toyota Fortuner (2005–present, localized 2007)
 Toyota Kijang Innova (2004–present)
 Toyota Veloz (2021–present)
 Toyota Yaris (2006–present, localized 2014)

Manufactured locally by Daihatsu 
 Toyota Agya (2012–present)
 Toyota Avanza (2003–present)
 Toyota Calya (2016–present)
 Toyota Raize (2021–present)
 Toyota Rush (2006–present)

Manufactured locally by Hino 
 Toyota Dyna (2009–present)

Imported 
Toyota
 Toyota Alphard (2008–present, imported from Japan)
 Toyota bZ4X (2022–present, imported from Japan)
 Toyota Camry (2002–present, imported from Thailand)
 Toyota Corolla Altis (2001–present, imported from Thailand)
 Toyota Corolla Cross (2020–present, imported from Thailand)
 Toyota C-HR (2018–present, imported from Thailand)
 Toyota GR Supra (2019–present, imported from Austria)
 Toyota 86/GR86 (2012–present, imported from Japan)
 Toyota HiAce Commuter (2012–present, imported from Japan)
 Toyota HiAce Premio (2019–present, imported from Japan)
 Toyota Hilux (2007–present, imported from Thailand)
 Toyota Land Cruiser (imported from Japan)
 Toyota Prius PHEV (2020–present, imported from Japan, fleet only)
 Toyota RAV4 PHEV (2023–present, imported from Japan)
 Toyota Vios (2022–present, imported from Thailand)
 Toyota Vellfire (2015–present, imported from Japan)
 Toyota Voxy (2017–present, imported from Japan)

Lexus
 Lexus UX (imported from Japan)
 Lexus NX (imported from Japan)
 Lexus RX (imported from Japan)
 Lexus LX (imported from Japan)
 Lexus RZ (imported from Japan)
 Lexus ES (imported from Japan)
 Lexus LS (imported from Japan)
 Lexus LC (imported from Japan)
 Lexus LM (imported from Japan)

Former models 
 Toyota Corolla (1971–2001)
 Toyota Corona (1971–1998)
 Toyota Cressida (1977–1992)
 Toyota Crown (1971–2008, late models imported from Japan)
 Toyota Etios (2013–2015, imported from India, fleet only)
 Toyota Etios Valco (2013–2017)
 Toyota GR Yaris (2021, imported from Japan)
 Toyota HiAce (1971–1985)
 Toyota Kijang (1977–2007)
 Toyota Land Cruiser Prado (1998–2001, imported from Japan)
 Toyota Mark X (2012–2013, imported from Japan)
 Toyota NAV1 (2012–2017)
 Toyota Previa (2000–2011, imported from Japan)
 Toyota RAV4 (2001–2003; 2014–2015, imported from Japan)
 Toyota Sienta (2016–2023)
 Toyota Soluna (2000–2003)
 Toyota Starlet (1984–1998)

Notes

References 

Car manufacturers of Indonesia
Toyota subsidiaries
Toyota Motor Manufacturing Indonesia
Companies based in Jakarta
Vehicle manufacturing companies established in 1971
1971 establishments in Indonesia